Olivier Schoenfelder (born 30 November 1977) is a French retired ice dancer and coach. With partner Isabelle Delobel, he is the 2008 World champion, the 2007 European and the 2008 Grand Prix Final champion.

Career

Schoenfelder began skating after seeing Isabelle and Paul Duchesnay at an ice show and switched to ice dancing after only six months in singles.

Delobel and Schoenfelder were paired together in 1990 by coach Lydie Bontemps on the suggestion of Irina Moiseeva and Andrei Minenkov. They won a silver medal at 1996 Junior Worlds before moving up to the senior ranks prior to the 1996–97 season. They won their first Grand Prix medal at the 1999 Skate Canada. Early in their career, they were coached by Muriel Boucher-Zazoui in Lyon, France. Tatiana Tarasova and Nikolai Morozov were their choreographers from 1998–2002 and their coaches from 2000–2002 in Newington, Connecticut. While practising a lift at French Nationals in December 2001, Delobel tore an abdominal muscle, keeping her off the ice for six weeks and forcing the team to miss the European Championships. Feeling more comfortable in France, Delobel and Schoenfelder decided to return to Lyon and Boucher-Zazoui after the 2001–2002 season.

They won their first national championship in the 2002–03 season. Delobel and Schoenfelder worked with choreographer Pasquale Camerlengo for the 2005-06 season.

Delobel and Schoenfelder often finished just off the podium at major events, including a 4th place at the 2006 Olympics, less than two points behind the bronze medalists. The following season, they won their only European title but were unable to win a medal at Worlds.

Delobel and Schoenfelder did not repeat as European champions the following year, finishing second. They then went on to win the 2008 World Championships. They were first in both the compulsory and original dance portions of the event, and second in the free dance. They considered retiring but decided to continue competing.

They began the 2008–09 season with wins in all three Grand Prix appearances – Skate America, Trophée Eric Bompard, and the Grand Prix Final. During their gala exhibition performance at the Grand Prix Final in December 2009, Delobel suffered a shoulder injury and underwent surgery on 5 January 2009, causing them to miss the remainder of the season.

Delobel became pregnant during the injury layoff. She and Schoenfelder trained cautiously, with Marie-France Dubreuil substituting for Delobel in lifts. Dubreuil, along with Patrice Lauzon, also choreographed their final free dance. Occasional falls caused Delobel to leave the ice in late July.

Delobel's son was born in October and she returned to the ice toward the end of the month, beginning three-a-day sessions and intense physical training in November. They also skipped French Nationals and the European Championships in order to spend more time on training. The two returned in time for the Vancouver Olympics, competing just four-and-a-half months after she had given birth and announcing it would be their final competition. They finished sixth and retired from competitive skating. They continue to skate together in shows.

Schoenfelder now coaches in Lyon. Among others, he coaches Lucie Myslivečková / Neil Brown and Louise Walden / Owen Edwards.

Personal life 
Schoenfelder studied ballet before taking up skating, as his mother is a ballet instructor. Schoenfelder studied journalism and has done some television commentating. 

In May 2005, he married Isabelle Pecheur. They have a son together, Gabriel, born on 26 October 2006.

Programs 
(with Delobel)

Competitive highlights 
(with Delobel)

References

External links

 Isabelle Delobel / Olivier Schoenfelder official website
 

1977 births
Living people
Sportspeople from Belfort
French male ice dancers
Olympic figure skaters of France
Figure skaters at the 2002 Winter Olympics
Figure skaters at the 2006 Winter Olympics
Figure skaters at the 2010 Winter Olympics
World Figure Skating Championships medalists
European Figure Skating Championships medalists
World Junior Figure Skating Championships medalists
Season-end world number one figure skaters